Mennonites in Argentina belong to two quite different groups: conservative and very conservative Plautdietsch-speaking group of Russian Mennonites who are descendants of Frisian, Flemish and Prussian people, and converts to the Mennonite faith from the general Argentinian population. The Russian Mennonites are the third largest community of Mennonites in South America, with six colonies in Argentina. While Russian Mennonites have their own language and customs and live in colonies, converts to the Mennonite faith normally live in cities and speak Spanish and do not differ much from other Protestants in Argentina. Conservative ethnic Mennonites normally do not engage in missionary activities but look for a quiet and remote place where they can live according to their tradition. More liberal Mennonites are engaged in worldwide missionary work like other North American Protestant denominations. About one third of Mennonites in Argentina are conservative ethnic Mennonites who belong to the Altkolonier branch.

The Mennonites as a religious group can trace back their roots to the time of the Protestant Reformation. They belonged to the radical wing of the Reformation who tried to base its faith only on the Bible as God's word and live according to it.

History and ethnicity 
Most ethnic Mennonites have a long history of migrations. The ethnic Mennonites in Argentina are descendants of Vistula delta Mennonites, who migrated around 1800 to a part of the Russian Empire that today belongs to the Ukraine. From there they migrated to Canada in the 1870s and from there to Mexico and Paraguay in 1920s. A major migration of Mennonites to Argentina occurred from 1986 to 1987, mainly from Mexico, Uruguay and Paraguay. 

Although from different countries, all are of the same Dutch-Prussian ethnic background which developed into an ethnic group in the Russian Empire. Therefore, they are often somewhat misleadingly called "Russian" Mennonites (German: Russland-Mennoniten). The ethno-language of these Mennonites is Plautdietsch.

Mission and settlements in Argentina 

North American Mennonite missionaries (Mennonite Church (MC)) started to work in Argentina in 1917. Work among Indians in the far north Chaco territory started in 1943. In 1953 there were 745 members in congregations founded by these missionaries. 

In 1948 a first group of about 150 ethnic Mennonites from Russia heading for Paraguay stranded in Argentina. They settled mostly in Buenos Aires and assimilated more or less into the Argentinian society. Ethnic Mennonites from Paraguay joined them bringing their total number to about 400 in the mid 1950s.

In the year 1986 a group of very conservative ethnic Mennonites from Capulin colony, close to the city of Nuevo Casas Grandes in the northern parts of Chihuahua, Mexico came to Argentina and founded "La Nueva Esperanza" colony 40 kilometres from Guatraché, La Pampa. A second colony of similar immigrants was founded near Pampa de los Guanacos, Santiago del Estero in 1995 by Mennonites from Durango, Mexico. In 2004 settlers from "La Nueva Esperanza" colony near Guatraché founded "Colonia del Norte" near the city of Santiago del Estero. Both the settlement near Guatraché and the settlements in Santiago del Estero Province have around 10,000 hectares. In 2014 Old Colony Mennonites from Santa Rita Colony north of Cuauhtémoc in the Mexican state of Chihuahua founded a new colony of about 9,500 hectares 30 km far from Villa Mercedes, San Luis. In 2019, a group of Mennonites from Chihuahua and Canada, bought  of land near Arizona, Gobernador Dupuy Department, San Luis,  from the state capital, which will be 180 families (about 1,000 people). A 2020 survey found that there are more than 200 Mennonite colonies in nine Latin American countries, with 6 in Argentina.

Populations

The number of adult members of the Mennonite faith in Argentina in 2012 was 4,678. Of these 1440 were members of Old Colony Mennonite congregations with a Germanic background, whereas the rest of 3,238 was mostly in Spanish-speaking congregations.

Customs and beliefs 
The ethnic Mennonites in their four colonies have been mostly engaged in tilling the land and live a simple life without electricity, cars, telephones, television, or other developments of modern life. They are distinguished by their plain cloths and their understanding of the Christian faith, which is very important to stay away from the world. Relations with the outside world are restricted to the purchase of raw materials and selling products.

Languages 
Ethnic Mennonites in Argentina speak Plautdietsch in everyday life and use an old-fashioned Standard German in reading, writing and singing. In addition, Spanish is spoken fluently by some settlers and taught in schools. By 2007, 1,300 people were surveyed in the town of Remecó, La Pampa, consisting of approximately 200 families, with an average of 8 to 12 children each. Converts to the Mennonite faith speak the language they spoke before their conversion, that is mostly Spanish.

Labour and production

The Mennonite colony "La Nueva Esperanza", in La Pampa, produces  of milk per day and over 500 silos per year. They have about 5,000 head of cattle, and most families, a dairy farm. As well, grow potatoes, radish, cucumber, pumpkin, onion, pepper, carrot, sunflower, lettuce, cabbage, and cilantro; they raise poultry, pigs and horses. Through a civil partnership, they sell several products to the rest of Argentina, such as cheese, pasta with mozzarella, wheat, furniture, silos and other implements for agriculture.

See also
 Immigration to Argentina
 Religion in Argentina
 German Argentine
 Mennonites in Belize
 Mennonites in Bolivia
 Mennonites in Colombia
 Mennonites in Mexico
 Mennonites in Uruguay

Literature 

 Cañás Bottos, Lorenzo: Old Colony Mennonites in Argentina and Bolivia : Nation Making, Religious Conflict and Imagination of the Future. Leiden et al. 2008.
 Cañás Bottos, Lorenzo: Christenvolk: Historia y Etnografia de una Colonia Menonita. Buenos Aires 2005. (This Spanish language book is about Mennonites in Argentina)

References

External links

"Data for "Pious Pioneers: The expansion of Mennonite colonies in Latin America"", This data is provided in support of the paper "Pious Pioneers: The expansion of Mennonite colonies in Latin America", published in the Journal of Land Use Science, December 15, 2020, 1–17 

Immigration to Argentina